The 2020 Finnish Women's Curling Championship was held at the Kisakallio Sports Institute in Lohja from December 5, 2019 to January 5, 2020.

The team skipped by Milja Sullanmaa won the championship (Sullanmaa won her second title as player but first title as skip).

The 2020 Finnish Men's Curling Championship was held simultaneously with this championship at the same arena.

Teams

Round Robin

Round 1
December 5, 2019; 19:00

December 6, 2019; 20:00

December 7, 2019; 12:00

Round 2
December 7, 2019; 20:00

December 8, 2019; 08:00

December 8, 2019; 17:00

Round 3
January 2, 2020; 19:00

January 3, 2020; 16:00

January 4, 2020; 08:00

Round 4
January 4, 2020; 16:00

January 5, 2020; 09:00

January 5, 2020; 13:00

Final standings

References

External links

See also
2020 Finnish Men's Curling Championship

2020
Finnish Women's Curling Championship
Finnish Women's Curling Championship
Curling Women's Championship
Finnish Women's Curling Championship
Finnish Women's Curling Championship
Sports competitions in Lohja